Lake Stemper is a lake in Hillsborough County, Florida, in the United States.

Lake Stemper was named for Father Francis Xavier Augustus Stemper, a Catholic priest who oversaw a local mission.

References

Stemper
Stemper